LaMont Damon Jordan (born November 11, 1978) is an American football coach and former running back. He was drafted by the New York Jets in the second round of the 2001 NFL Draft. He played college football at Maryland.

Jordan also played for the Oakland Raiders, New England Patriots and Denver Broncos. As a coach, he was the running backs coach for the San Diego Fleet of the Alliance of American Football (AAF) in 2019.

Early years
Jordan graduated from Suitland High School in 1997. A highly sought-after area prospect, he won many awards in high school, and played football and baseball, and was a member of the school's swimming and track teams.

College career
He attended the University of Maryland, College Park, and as a freshman, gained notice as a first-string player, and finished as runner-up for Rookie of the Year in the Atlantic Coast Conference. As a sophomore, he was named to the second-team All-ACC, and was named by Maryland as the team's most outstanding offensive player. As a junior, he began to gain national notice, and was a semifinalist for the Doak Walker Award. In the same year, he was named to the All-ACC first-team, and surpassed Maryland's single-season rushing record. That season, he gained over six yards per carry, one of only four NCAA players to do so. He was the NCAA rushing leader over the last six games of his junior season. He sat out the drills preceding the 2000 season due to fears of academic ineligibility, and, having a somewhat lackluster senior year, was named to the ACC second-team.

Professional career

New York Jets
Jordan was drafted in the second round of the 2001 NFL Draft by the New York Jets. Jordan spent his first four years as a backup to Curtis Martin before becoming a free agent.

Oakland Raiders
After the 2004 season, Jordan signed a five-year, $27.5 million contract with the Oakland Raiders. He wore No. 34. Jordan rushed for a career-high 1,025 yards in 2005 while leading all NFL running backs in receptions with 70.

On November 19, 2006, Jordan tore his medial collateral ligament in a game against the Kansas City Chiefs and missed the rest of the season.
Jordan started the 2007 season with 350 yards rushing and two touchdowns in the first three games. He injured his back against the Miami Dolphins and was replaced by Justin Fargas. Fargas was productive and was named the starter for the next four games. On July 25, 2008 Jordan was released by the Raiders.

New England Patriots
On July 26, 2008, Jordan signed a one-year contract with the New England Patriots.

Denver Broncos
On March 4, 2009, Jordan signed a two-year, $2.5 million contract with the Denver Broncos.  The deal included a $500,000 signing bonus.  The move reunited him with Broncos head coach Josh McDaniels, who was the Patriots' offensive coordinator in 2008.

Jordan was released on February 23, 2010.

Coaching career
On December 19, 2018, Jordan was named running backs coach for the San Diego Fleet of the Alliance of American Football.

Personal life
Jordan is a supporter of the Maryland Terrapins women's basketball team.  He has traveled to several ACC tournament games as well as the 2006 National Championship Game. He has also donated $25,000 to the women's basketball team. Jordan also owns his own restaurant, which was featured on an episode of Diners, Drive-Ins and Dives.

References

External links
Denver Broncos bio
Maryland Terrapins bio
New England Patriots bio
New York Jets bio
Oakland Raiders bio

1978 births
Living people
People from Forestville, Maryland
American football running backs
Players of American football from Maryland
Maryland Terrapins football players
New York Jets players
Oakland Raiders players
New England Patriots players
Denver Broncos players
San Diego Fleet coaches